{{DISPLAYTITLE:Nu1 Canis Majoris}}

Nu1 Canis Majoris (ν1 Canis Majoris) is a binary star in the constellation Canis Major. It is visible to the naked eye with a combined apparent visual magnitude of 5.7. Based on parallax shift of 12.366 mas as seen from our orbit, this system is approximately 264 light years from the Sun.

As of 2011, the pair had an angular separation of 17.29 arc seconds along a position angle of 264.2°. The yellow hued magnitude 5.87 primary, component A, is an evolved G-type giant star with a stellar classification of G8 III. Its magnitude 7.61 companion, component B, is a yellow-white hued F-type main sequence/subgiant hybrid with a class of F3 IV-V.

References

External links
 Sketch of the star as seen through a telescope

Binary stars
G-type giants
F-type main-sequence stars
F-type subgiants
Canis Majoris, Nu1
Canis Major
Durchmusterung objects
Canis Majoris, 06
047138
031564
2423